Emiliano Boffelli (born 16 January 1995) is an Argentine rugby union player who plays as a utility back for Edinburgh Rugby in the United Rugby Championship.

Super Rugby

Boffelli was named in the Jaguares squad for their first ever Super Rugby campaign in 2016 in which he earned 11 caps and scored 3 tries.

International career

Boffelli represented Argentina at both Under 18 and 19 level before being selected in the Under-20 sides which competed in the World Championships in 2013, 2014 and 2015.   In 2015, he also turned out 5 times for Argentine representative side the Pampas XV on their Pacific Rim tour.

References

External links
 

1995 births
Living people
Argentine rugby union players
Rugby union wings
Rugby union centres
Jaguares (Super Rugby) players
Pampas XV players
Sportspeople from Rosario, Santa Fe
Pan American Games medalists in rugby sevens
Pan American Games silver medalists for Argentina
Rugby sevens players at the 2015 Pan American Games
Argentina international rugby union players
Medalists at the 2015 Pan American Games
Racing 92 players
Edinburgh Rugby players